

The Freewing Scorpion is a reconnaissance UAV of unusual design developed in the United States in the early 21st century by a company associated with the University of Maryland, College Park, Freewing Aerial Robotics Corporation. Working with well-known small-aircraft designer Burt Rutan, Freewing designed a series of piston-powered short-takeoff-and-landing UAVs, based on a design where the fuselage pivots relative to the wing surfaces. The "freewing" design also allows the UAV to operate as a stable observation platform during turbulent conditions.

The Scorpion will be offered for a US Army short-range UAV requirement, and is being proposed by Matra of France for use on French navy frigates and patrol boats. The Matra version is named "Marvel" and will carry a Matra-designed electro-optical day-night camera system initially, but the French navy has expressed interest in extending the payload to include communications relay, electronic warfare, and antisubmarine warfare equipment. Freewing is also offering the similar but smaller "Scorpiette", with a payload of up to 6.8 kilograms (15 pounds) for commercial, third-world military, and law enforcement organizations.

Specifications (Scorpion 100)

References
This article contains material that originally came from the web article Unmanned Aerial Vehicles by Greg Goebel, which exists in the Public Domain.

2000s United States military reconnaissance aircraft
Unmanned aerial vehicles of the United States
Aircraft manufactured in the United States